The Carrickfergus Advertiser was a weekly newspaper in the east Antrim town of Carrickfergus.

History and profile
It was owned by the Alpha Newspaper Group, which is partly owned by former UUP MP John Taylor.

The East Antrim Gazette Series had three editions - The Carrickfergus Advertiser, (established in 1883), and the Ballyclare Gazette and Larne Gazette, which both commenced publication in 1994. The Carrickfergus Advertiser was the traditional weekly newspaper of the Borough and was the only paper with a full-time office in the centre of Carrickfergus. The three editions circulated in an area with a population of 80,000 and the Carrickfergus Advertiser was a very popular paper with all sections of the community throughout the Borough of Carrickfergus.

ITN journalist Dermot Murnaghan started his career at the Carrickfergus Advertiser. The paper was closed down in January 2014.

References

1883 establishments in Ireland
2014 disestablishments in Northern Ireland
Publications established in 1883
Publications disestablished in 2014
Weekly newspapers published in the United Kingdom
Mass media in County Antrim
Advertiser